Deer Run is a tributary of the Tohickon Creek in Bedminster Township, Bucks County, Pennsylvania in the United States.

Statistics
Deer Run is contained wholly within Bedminster Township and is part of the Delaware River watershed. It's GNIS identification number is 1192341, the PA Department of Environmental Resources identification number is 03142. It meets its confluence at the Tohickon Creek's 8.00 river mile.

Course

Geology
Appalachian Highlands Division
Piedmont Province
Gettysburg-Newark Lowland Section
Brunswick Formation
Wolf Run lies within the Brunswick Formation in the Newark Basin laid down during the Jurassic and the Triassic. Rocks includes mudstone, siltstone, and reddish-brown, green, and brown shale. Mineralogy includes red and dark-gray argillite and hornfels.

Crossings and Bridges
Deer Run Road
Rolling Hills Road
Creamery Road
Fretz Valley Road
Center School Road
Center School Road
Sweetbriar Road

See also
List of rivers of Pennsylvania

References

Rivers of Pennsylvania
Rivers of Bucks County, Pennsylvania
Tributaries of Tohickon Creek